The 2016 European Shotgun Championships was the 62nd edition of the global shotgun competition, European Shotgun Championships, organised by the European Shooting Confederation.

Results

Men

Women
 No medals awarded owing to lack to entries

Mixed

Medal table

See also
 Shotgun
 European Shooting Confederation
 International Shooting Sport Federation

References

External links
 
Results book

European Shooting Championships
European Shotgun Championships